Associazione Sportiva Dilettantistica Comunale Fontanafredda, commonly referred to as Fontanafredda, is an Italian football club based in Fontanafredda, Friuli-Venezia Giulia. Currently it plays in Eccellenza Friuli-Venezia Giulia.

History
The club was founded in 1925 with the name O.N.D. Fontanafredda and in 1940 becomes Gil Fontanafredda. New name change in 1945: the team is called the Club della Fonte, and then in 1963 took the name S.S. Fontanafredda. The sporting results lead the club to climb the categories. In May 2007 the Fontanafredda executives received the gold medal for 75 years of affiliation from the highest authorities of the FIGC of Rome.
In the summer of 2013, when the club is in Eccellenza, the merger with A.S.D. Vigonovo Ranzano, which gives life to A.S.D. Comunale Fontanafreddda. The union brought good results and the Rossoneri won the championship by climbing to Serie D under the guidance of Maurizio De Pieri. The youth sector, which has long been the pride of the area, has achieved several successes at various levels. Mario Pagotto was the most successful player in the history of Fontanafredda, where he was born and raised in football. In the grande Bologna he won three league titles in the 1936–37, 1938–39 and 1940–41 seasons and played in the Vittorio Pozzo's national team.
The stadium is named after Omero Tognon. Midfielder, he played his entire career (with the exception of the last two years for FC Pordenone in the fourth serie) in AC Milan, at the turn of the forties and fifties, coming to be the captain, winning the championships of 1950-51 and 1954–55. In his career he totaled 293 matches in Serie A, scoring only two goals, the last of which earned him the draw in the derby of November 4, 1951. After ceasing his competitive activity, he began that of coach, carried out mainly in the series minors. With the shirt of the Italy national team he took part in the 1950 and 1954 world cups.

Serie D 
In the season 2013–14 the team was promoted, from Eccellenza Friuli-Venezia Giulia to Serie D.

Recent seasons

Key

 Top regional leagues in Friuli-Venezia Giulia (FVG) :
 1959–1969 Prima Categoria (2 groups)
 1969–1991 Promozione (1 group)
 1991–today Eccellenza (1 group)
 Serie D name changes :
 1959–1981 Serie D (more groups)
 1981–1992 Interregionale (more groups)
 1992–2000 Campionato Nazionale Dilettanti (CND) (more groups)
 2000-today Serie D (more groups)

Honours
Eccellenza Friuli-Venezia Giulia (1st regional level)
Winners: 1974–75, 1984–85, 1988–89, 2013–14

Promozione Friuli-Venezia Giulia (2nd regional level)
Winners: 1973–74, 2002–03, 2007–08

Coppa Italia Dilettanti Friuli-Venezia Giulia
Winners: 2010–11

Colors and badge 
The team's colors are red and black for home games and white and red for away games.

References

External links
 Official homepage 

Football clubs in Italy
Football clubs in Friuli-Venezia Giulia
Association football clubs established in 1925
1925 establishments in Italy